The Canada Elections Act  (full title: An Act respecting the election of members to the House of Commons, repealing other Acts relating to elections and making consequential amendments to other Acts, full title in ) is an Act of the Parliament of Canada which regulates the election of members of parliament to the House of Commons of Canada.  The Act has been amended many times over Canada's history.

The Canada Election Act limits spending on election advertising by interest groups, which was upheld by the Supreme Court of Canada in Harper v. Canada (Attorney General) (2004).  It also sets out various provisions regarding the publication or broadcast of election advertising and election results.

In 1989, the government of Canada appointed the Royal Commission on Electoral Reform and Party Financing regarding restrictions in the Elections Act inconsistent with Section Three of the Canadian Charter of Rights and Freedoms.

In 1996, the Act was amended to establish a Register of Electors.

In 2003, the Act was extended to cover the nomination contests of registered parties.  In 2007, it was amended to mandate fixed election dates.

Notable provisions
  Section 56.1 establishes a fixed election date for federal general elections as the third Monday of October in the fourth calendar year following the last general election while retaining the power of the Governor General to dissolve Parliament earlier at their discretion. Its companion section 56.2 permits the Chief Electoral Officer (with the consent of the Cabinet) to shift the election day by either 1 day or 1 week to avoid conflicts with cultural days or with other elections in Canada.
 Section 329 of the Act outlawed publishing election results from other ridings in constituencies where polls are still open. This section was upheld by the Supreme Court in R. v. Bryan (2007), but was repealed in 2015 because the wide use of the internet and social media had made it outdated and difficult to enforce.
 Section 335 requires that all broadcasters make 6.5 hours of advertising available for purchase by political parties over the course of a general election during "prime time" (the evening hours for TV stations and specialty channels, and morning and afternoon drive for radio stations). Even broadcasters that do not ordinarily accept advertising, such as the CBC's radio services, and (since 2017) premium pay TV channels like Crave/HBO and Super Channel, are required to accept these political ads during a federal election.
 Section 345 requires that all CRTC-licensed over-the-air radio and television networks, which reach the majority of Canadians in the language of broadcast, allocate free time for election broadcasts (in addition to the paid availabilities described above). However, there are no restrictions on when these free-time broadcasts must air, and most of these networks now confine them to late night.
 As of 2011, the networks subject to this provision are CBC Television, Ici Radio-Canada Télé, CBC Radio One, Ici Radio-Canada Première, TVA, and V. The amount of free time per election varies by network, from roughly 3.5 hours (for the CBC's TV networks) to 62 minutes (for TVA and V).
 Historically, CTV and the Radiomédia / Corus Québec radio network were also subject to free-time allocations; the Corus Québec network has since ceased operation, while CTV has not operated under a CRTC-issued national network licence since 2001 (and other "networks" such as Global have never operated under such licences). Note that there is currently no free-time allocation required for individual private radio or television stations, or cable specialty channels.
  Section 482(b), which finds anyone who "induces a person to vote or refrain from voting or to vote or refrain from voting for a particular candidate at an election" guilty of intimidation of the electoral process. Anyone convicted under s. 482(b) faces, on a summary conviction, a maximum $2,000 fine, or a maximum of one year in prison, or both. On an indictment, individuals found guilty face a maximum of five years in prison, a maximum $5,000 fine, or both.

Political action committees

In 2015, wealthy U.S.-style political action committees (PAC) organizations were introduced to Ontario and Alberta and were expected to play a major role in Canadian political elections at the provincial and federal level. PACs are new to Canadian federal politics and are "technically federal non-profit corporations" registered with Industry Canada. The Canada Elections Act allows PACs to "spend up to $150,000 on third-party advertising during an election" but "spending outside the election period is [/was] unlimited." up until the enactment of the  Elections Modernization Act in 2018, even after which spending was nonetheless unlimited outside of the defined pre-election periods. In Ontario, the union-funded Working Families Coalition, spent millions on anti-conservative ads before the 2015 Ontario provincial elections. The left-leaning organization Engage Canada, which released its first anti-Harper attack ad early June 2015. The right-leaning Conservative PAC Foundation founded by high-profile Alberta conservatives Jonathan Denis, Brad Tennant and Zoe Addington in June 2015 funded advertising in support of Conservative Prime Minister Stephen Harper. The developer-funded right-wing group Ontario Proud and related groups have been active in Canadian elections since 2018.

See also

 Canadian federal election
 Federal political financing in Canada
 Reform Act (Canada)

References

External links
 Department of Justice of Canada - Canada Elections Act text
 Bil C-2: The Canada Elections Act (LS-343E)

Canadian federal legislation
Elections in Canada
2000 in Canadian law
Canadian election legislation